CS40 may refer to:

Cordata CS40, a computer design of the 1980s
CS 40, a Canadian sailboat design of the 1980s